Sievekingia is a genus of orchid, comprising 20 species found in Central and South America, from Nicaragua east to the Guianas and south to Bolivia.

The following species are recognized as of June 2014:

Sievekingia butcheri Dressler - Panama
Sievekingia colombiana Garay - Colombia, Ecuador
Sievekingia cristata Garay - Ecuador
Sievekingia dunstervilleorum Foldats - Venezuela
Sievekingia filifera Dressler - Colombia
Sievekingia fimbriata Rchb.f. - Panama, Costa Rica
Sievekingia herklotziana Jenny - Colombia
Sievekingia herrenhusana Jenny - Ecuador
Sievekingia hirtzii Waldv.  - Ecuador
Sievekingia jenmanii Rchb.f.  - Venezuela, the Guianas
Sievekingia marsupialis Dodson  - Colombia, Ecuador
Sievekingia peruviana Rolfe ex C.Schweinf. - Peru
Sievekingia reichenbachiana Rolfe  - Colombia, Ecuador
Sievekingia rhonhofiae Mansf.  - Ecuador
Sievekingia suavis Rchb.f. - Panama, Costa Rica, Nicaragua, Colombia
Sievekingia trollii Mansf. - Bolivia

References

Stanhopeinae genera
Stanhopeinae